This article lists the winners and nominees for the NAACP Image Award for Outstanding Actor in a Motion Picture.

Winners and nominees
For each year in the tables below, the winner is listed first and highlighted in bold.

1960s

1970s

1980s

1990s

2000s

2010s

2020s

Multiple wins and nominations

Wins

 13 wins
 Denzel Washington

 3 wins
 Morgan Freeman

 2 wins
 Chadwick Boseman
 Danny Glover
 Michael B. Jordan
 Will Smith
 Forest Whitaker
 Billy Dee Williams

Nominations

 23 nominations
 Denzel Washington

 14 nominations
 Will Smith

 10 nominations
 Laurence Fishburne

 9 nominations
 Morgan Freeman

 7 nominations
 Danny Glover
 Samuel L. Jackson
 Eddie Murphy

 6 nominations
 Chadwick Boseman

 4 nominations
 Don Cheadle
 Idris Elba
 Jamie Foxx
 Cuba Gooding, Jr.
 Gregory Hines
 Michael B. Jordan
 Sidney Poitier

 3 nominations
 Bill Cosby
 Daniel Kaluuya
 Forest Whitaker
 Billy Dee Williams

 2 nominations
 Ice Cube
 Taye Diggs
 Chiwetel Ejiofor
 Louis Gossett Jr.
 Terrence Howard
 Stephan James
 James Earl Jones
 Anthony Mackie
 Jonathan Majors
 Nate Parker
 Wesley Snipes
 Chris Tucker

References

NAACP Image Awards
Film awards for lead actor